The Islamic Azad University, Roudehen Branch is officially affiliated to Islamic Azad University, globally, the largest attending university with around 400 branches both nationally and internationally in Kabul, Dubai, Beirut, and Oxford (England). Islamic Azad University Roudehen Branch (RIAU) offers more than 100 undergraduate and graduate degree programs in a wide range of disciplines with an approximate enrollment of 20,000 undergraduate and graduate students. The university is organized into nine faculties and two research centers. The Faculties are Faculty of Education and Counseling, Psychology, Science, Social Sciences, Agriculture, Persian Literature and Foreign Languages, Engineering, Art and Architecture, and Economy and Accounting.

History

Roudehen
Roudehen, once a small town on Tehran to Mazandaran province route, is now a major educational center. It is located at the southern foot of Alborz mountain range,  to the east of capital city Tehran. Geographically, Roudehen region is within Tehran province. Roudehen had witnessed remarkable social, cultural, and scientific development following the establishment of a branch of Islamic Azad University in 1983. Nowadays, the city is known as a leading academic hub. The university graduates are the best representatives of the Islamic Azad University Roudehen Branch at home and abroad. They have also played a crucial role in the various on-going nationwide scientific and research activities due to their considerable achievements. In short, Roudehen, which was once a small town, has developed socially, culturally, and scientifically in the recent years.

RIAU
Following the foundation of Islamic Azad University (IAU) in large cities like Tehran, Islamic Azad University Roudehen Branch(RIAU) was founded on November 5, 1983, in the vicinity of capital city Tehran. This has opened up new horizons in the development of Roudehen city. Since 1986, the city has witnessed such changes as rapid development of the university, migration, population growth, and socioeconomic changes which are still on the increase. One of the benefactors who helped establish this higher education center was the late Ayatollah Seyed Ahmad Mirkhani who, besides his religious activities and authoring books, was interested in social and cultural affairs. He generously donated a building for the university to obtain the permit to establish a branch. Thanks to his generous effort, thousands of young knowledge seekers from all around the country have attended the university to reap the benefit. Seyed Kazem Shariatpanahi was appointed the first chancellor of Roudehen Branch which was formally inaugurated on November 5, 1983, by top ranking officials from Islamic Azad University and local authorities. The first groups of students were admitted on the spring semester of the academic year 1983–1984. Having been busy with a few responsibilities in IAU testing center, Mr. Shariatpanahi resigned and in September 1986, Seyed Mohammad Hosseini was appointed as the next chancellor of IAU Roudehen Branch.  Seyed Mehdi Hosseini's tenure as the Roudehen Branch chancellor lasted about 21 years. In November 2007, Dr. Gholamhossein Heidari was assigned as the third chancellor who had taken the position for five years. On August 26, 2012, Prof. Alireza Iranbakhsh was appointed as the chancellor of Islamic Azad University Roudehen Branch. Since April 14, 2014, Prof. Naghi Shoja has been appointed as the fifth RIAU chancellor. After three decades of going through the rollercoaster of ups and downs, RIAU has relied on the protection of divine providence and banked on the support of a reservoir of expert knowledge in university on its way to success. As a result of its successful academic achievements and development all through these years, the university has recently been granted the grade of "Comprehensive" which positions the university among the top IAU branches. This outstanding success in the history of RIAU, as the largest university in the eastern Tehran, has created an atmosphere to further its academic endeavors.

Programs and Courses 
Islamic Azad University Roudehen Branch (RIAU) offers more than 100 undergraduate and graduate degree programs in a wide range of disciplines. The university is organized into nine faculties and two research centers. The Faculties are Faculty of Education and Counseling, Faculty of Psychology, Faculty of Science, Faculty of Social Sciences, Faculty of Agriculture, Faculty of Persian Literature and Foreign Languages, Faculty of Engineering, Faculty of Art and Architecture, and Faculty of Economy and Accounting.

Faculty of Persian Literature and Foreign Languages

Undergraduate Programs
1	Persian Language and Literature	BA
2	English Language Teaching	BA
3	English Language Translation	BA
4	English Language and Literature	BA

Postgraduate Programs
1	Persian Language and Literature	MA
2	English Language Teaching	MA
3	Persian Language and Literature	PhD

 Faculty of Education and Counseling

Undergraduate Programs
1	Educational Management and Programing	BA
2	Preschool Education	BA
3	Counseling and Guidance 	BA
4	Physical Education & Sports Science - Sports Physiology	BA
5	Physical Education & Sports Science – Management and Programming	BA
6	Library and Information Science	BA

Postgraduate Programs

1	History and Philosophy of Education	MA
2	Educational Research	MA
3	Educational Programing	MA
4	Educational Administration	MA
5	Counseling and Guidance	MA
6	Library and Information Science	MA
7	Educational Administration	PhD

 Faculty of Psychology

Undergraduate Programs
1	Clinical Psychology	BA
2	General Psychology	BA
3	Psychology – Corrections and Rehabilitation	BA

Postgraduate Programs
1	Clinical Psychology	MA
2	General Psychology	MA
3	Educational Psychology	PhD

 Faculty of Social Sciences

Undergraduate Programs
1	Social Programing	BA
2	Social Services 	BA
3	Teaching Social Sciences	BA
4	Political Sciences	BA
5	Family Studies	BA
6	Islamic Law and Jurisprudence	BA

Postgraduate Programs
1	Research in Social Sciences	MA
2	Population Studies 	MA
3	Women Studies 	MA

 Faculty of Engineering

Undergraduate Programs
1	Civil Technician	Associate's Degree
2	Computer - Software	Associate's Degree
3	Auto Mechanic	Associate's Degree
4	Building Services	Associate's Degree
5	Civil Engineering	BA
6	Computer Engineering - Software	BA
7	Computer Engineering - Hardware	BA
8	Mechanical Engineering	BA
9	Civil Engineering Technology 	BA
10	Water Resource Engineering	BA
11	Computer Engineering Technology - Software	BA
12	Computer Engineering Technology – Hardware	BA
13	Electrical Engineering Technology – Power	BA
14	Auto Mechanic Engineering Technology 	BA
15	Metallurgical Engineering 	BA
16	Telecommunication Engineering Technology – Network Switches 	BA

Postgraduate Programs
1	Structural Engineering	MA
2	Hydraulic Structures Engineering 	MA

 Faculty of Science

Undergraduate Programs
1	Statistics	BA
2	Applied Statistics	BA
3	Applied Mathematics	BA
4	General Biology	BA
5	Biology – Plant Sciences	BA
6	Biology – Animal Sciences	BA
7	Biology - Biophysics	BA
8	Biology - Biotechnology	BA
9	Chemistry – Information Technology	BA
10	Pure Chemistry	BA
11	Laboratory Sciences - Veterinary	BA

Postgraduate Programs
1	Structural Engineering	MA
2	Hydraulic Structures Engineering 	MA

 Faculty of Agriculture

Undergraduate Programs
1	Environmental Science	BS
2	Agricultural Products - Horticulture	BS
3	Agronomy and Plant Breeding 	BS
4	Agricultural Engineering - Horticulture	BS
5	Mechanics of Agricultural Machinery –Biosystem Engineering  	BS
6	Agricultural Engineering – Soil Science	BS
7	Agricultural Engineering – Agricultural Economics	BS
8	Food Technology and Nutrition	BS

Postgraduate Programs
1	Agricultural Engineering – Agricultural Economics	MS
2	Agronomy and Plant Breeding	MS

 Faculty of Art and Architecture

Undergraduate Programs
1	Architecture	Associates
2	Architectural Drawing	Associates
3	Graphic Designing	Associates
4	Architectural Engineering Technology	BS
5	Graphics	BS
6	Interior Architecture BS
7	Urban Planning 	BS
8	Architectural Engineering	BS

 Faculty of Economics and Accounting

Undergraduate Programs
1	Accounting (From High School Diploma)	Associate's Degree
2	Accounting (From Associate's Degree)	BA
3	Accounting (From High School Diploma)	BA
4	Economics – Business Economics	BA
5	Economics – Money and Banking	BA

Rankings 
ISC Rankings

In early 2019, Islamic World Science Citation Database declared the very first official ranking of Higher education and research institutes of Iran, The RIAU was ranked 25th among more than 400 Islamic Azad University branches:

Webometrics World University Ranking

RIAU has continued its year-on-year rise, ranking among the top higher education institutions in the world, according to the results of the July edition (2014) of world university ranking released by Webometrics. The results showed the marked rise of 1606 ranks among the world universities and an outstanding improvement of 1383 places among top Asian universities. Within the national scope, RIAU is among the first top 30 IAU branches and 140th among more than 500 universities and higher education institutions in Iran.

Civilica

According to Civilica ranking, which is a well-known ranking organization in Iran, this university was ranked among 100 top Iranian universities.

Google Scholar Ranking

Among more than 400 IAU branches, this branch was ranked 15th in Google Scholar ranking system.

Some of the scientific Achievements 

 Signing Memoranda of Understanding with a number of Iranian large organizations including Iran's Judiciary Branch to establish a research institute for the prevention of crime, UNIDO on nanotechnology, the research department  of Eastern Tehran Police Headquarters, Psychology and Counseling Organization of Iran, Islamic Azad University Kabul Branch.
 Receiving the official research permit as a qualified university from Iran's Ministry of Science, Research, and Technology
 Admission of Graduate students from Afghanistan in cooperation with IAU Kabul branch
 A 15,000-level increase during the past 30 years in the World's University Ranking reported by Webometrics
 Standing among the top four branches of IAU for the research quality (2013)
 Inauguration of Behavioral Science Research Center
 First place winner in the tenth National Student Spaghetti Bridge Competition (By Tolou Team)
 Third place winner in the National Computer Game Design Competition(Two-dimensional Game League) among 29 university teams (by Sky of Ideas Team)
 Second place winner in the National Spaghetti Bridge Competition in Amir Kabir Industrial University (2012)
 First place winner in the National Student Steel Bridge Competition
 Designing and constructing Unmanned Aerial Vehicle (UAV) and flying robots
 Establishing the Prof. Dianatnejad's Museum of Life Sciences
 An 18-level increase in ISC university ranking and standing 24th among 400 IAU branches.
 Granting "Scholarly Scientific-Research" rank to two journals of "Thoughts and Behavior" and "Epic Literature" by Ministry of Health and Medical Education and the Ministry of Science, Research, and Technology.
 Ranked first in Spaghetti Structure competition.

References

r
Education in Tehran Province
Buildings and structures in Tehran Province